The 1998 Big 12 Championship Game was played on December 5, 1998, at the Trans World Dome in St. Louis, Missouri, United States. The game determined the 1998 football champion of the Big 12 Conference. The Texas A&M Aggies, winners of the South Division of the Big 12, narrowly beat the Kansas State Wildcats, who won the North division, by a score of 36–33 in double overtime. This would be the only time the two teams met in the Big 12 Championship Game. Texas A&M would not win the South Division again until 2010, when they shared it with Oklahoma and Oklahoma State. K-State went on to win the North in 2000 and 2003, when they also beat Oklahoma to capture their first conference title since 1934.

The game remains infamous among K-State fans, as the Wildcats' loss prevented them from being invited to what would have been the program's first-ever National Championship game.

The Wildcats were coached by Bill Snyder. They came into the game with an 11–0 record, including an 8–0 record in Big 12 play. The Aggies, coached by R. C. Slocum, went into the game with a 10–2 record including a 7–1 mark in conference play.

Leading up to the game

The Wildcats were undefeated heading into the game, only needing a win to secure a spot in their first ever National Championship game after UCLA had already lost the same day.

Texas A&M was just coming off of a loss in the previous week to their bitter rival, the Texas Longhorns, 26–24.  The loss did not stop the Aggies from winning the South Division, and set them up with a match-up with the North Division Champion and #1 (Coaches Poll) team in the country, Kansas State.

Game summary
Ranked no. 10 nationally, Texas A&M rebounded from a 27–12 fourth-quarter deficit to edge top-ranked Kansas State 36–33 in double overtime.

Running back Sirr Parker scored 14 points on a pair of touchdown catches and a two-point conversion, rallying the Aggies to a 24-point surge in the final 9:20 of regulation and the extra periods.

Parker's unlikely 32-yard reception for the winning TD on a 3rd-and-17 situation for Texas A&M in the final overtime capped an evening of surprising developments for both teams. The final six-pointer also gave the Aggies their first football win in history over a team ranked first nationally at the time of the contest.

Texas A&M had trouble finding the end zone in the first half against the Wildcats’ defense, as KSU built a 17–6 halftime advantage. A pair of Russell Bynum field goals helped offset a brilliant passing performance by KSU quarterback Michael Bishop, who was 8-of-8 passing for 159 yards and a pair of TDs in the opening 30 minutes. Tight end Justin Swift was a favorite target as he made three catches for 47 yards and one score.

Linebacker Dat Nguyen led the Aggie defense with an interception to go along with a championship-most 17 total tackles. The pilfer led to a 57-yard Aggies’ scoring drive, capped by a two-yard scoring plunge by A&M freshman fullback Ja’Mar Toombs.

Quarterback Branndon Stewart reeled off 245 passing yards on 11-of-20 aerial work and two touchdowns in the final quarter and two overtime periods, as the Aggies mounted the greatest comeback in the brief history of the Big 12 Championship.

The two teams traded field goals in the first overtime session, with Bynum hitting from 18 yards and Gramatica connected from 22 yards.

In the second overtime, KSU drove to the eight-yard line on four rushing plays of 17 yards. The Wildcats put one more field goal on the board for a 33–30 lead. Texas A&M then converted as Parker caught the pass from Stewart and eluded one tackler before lunging over the pylon in the right corner for the winning score.

Scoring summary
First Quarter 
KSU (0–3) –  Martin Gramatica 47-yard field goal; 6:31 
KSU (0–10) –  Justin Swift 15-yard pass from Michael Bishop, (Gramatica kick); 2:02 
 
Second Quarter 
A&M (3–10) –  Russell Bynum 25-yard field goal; 11:00 
KSU (3–17) –  Darnell McDonald 66-yard pass from Bishop (Gramatica kick); 10:37 
A&M (6–17) –  Bynum 26-yard field goal; 4:16

Third Quarter 
A&M (12–17) –  Ja’Mar Toombs 2-yard run (Pass failed); 8:42 
KSU (12–20) –  Gramatica 45-yard field goal; 4:31 
KSU (12–27) –  Bishop 5-yard run (Gramatica kick); 0:40 
 
Fourth Quarter 
A&M (19–27) –  Leroy Hodge 13-yard pass from Branndon Stewart (Bynum kick); 9:20 
A&M (27–27) –  Sirr Parker 9-yard pass from Stewart (Parker pass from Stewart); 1:05

First Overtime
A&M (30–27) –  Bynum 18-yard field goal 
KSU (30–30) –  Gramatica 22-yard field goal

Second Overtime 
KSU (30–33) –  Gramatica 25-yard field goal 
A&M (36–33) –  Parker 32-yard pass from Stewart

Game notes 

 This was the first Big 12 Championship game to go to overtime

After the game
The Aggies went on to win the game in double overtime, and earning a berth in the Sugar Bowl, where they went on to lose to #3 Ohio State, 24–14.

The Wildcats, anticipating a major bowl bid, fell all the way to the Alamo Bowl, losing to the Drew Brees led Purdue Boilermakers, 37–34.

See also
 List of historically significant college football games

References

Championship Game
Big 12 Championship Game
Kansas State Wildcats football games
Texas A&M Aggies football games
December 1998 sports events in the United States
St
20th century in St. Louis